Aria is a village and municipality located in the province and autonomous community of Navarre, northern Spain.

References

External links
 ARIA in the Bernardo Estornés Lasa - Auñamendi Encyclopedia (Euskomedia Fundazioa) 
 Aria Pirenèus

Municipalities in Navarre